Prithvi Rajan is an Indian actor, who has appeared in leading roles. He is the son of the veteran actor,  Pandiarajan.

Career
He made his debut in Kaivantha Kalai (2006) directed by his father Pandiarajan and the film opened to average reviews from critics. A critic noted Prithvi Rajan "makes his debut, does a convincing job and has his father's mannerisms." His next release, Naalaiya Pozhuthum Unnodu (2007), a romantic love story featuring Karthika Adaikalam had a much lower key release and failed at the box office. His next, Gemini Raghava's Vaidehi (2009), also featured the same actress.

During the making of Padhinettan Kudi Ellai Arambam, he was injured in a fire accident and suffered burn injuries. The film released in December 2011 with little publicity. His current project is Varatti, which features him alongside his brother Prem Rajan.

Personal life
Prithvi Rajan is the second son of actor-director Pandiarajan
. His elder brother Pallavarajan, had once announced a project starring Prithvi titled Eliyum Poonaiyum which never took off, while his younger brother Prem Rajan, is featuring in Prithvi's next film, Varatti.

He has also taken part in the Celebrity Cricket League representing the Chennai Rhinos, winning acclaim for his performances in the field.

Filmography

References

Indian male film actors
Living people
Male actors from Tamil Nadu
Male actors in Tamil cinema
1989 births